"My Love Is for Real" is a song by American singer and songwriter Paula Abdul with backing vocals from Israeli singer Ofra Haza. It was released on May 30, 1995, as the first single from Abdul's third studio album, Head over Heels (1995). Intended as Abdul's comeback single, "My Love Is for Real" reached number one in Hungary and the top 20 in Australia, Canada, and New Zealand, but it stalled outside the top 20 in the United States, peaking at number 28 on the Billboard Hot 100, and failed to make a major impact in Europe.

Song information
"My Love Is for Real" was written by Abdul and Rhett Lawrence. The song is a fusion of trip hop and traditional Indian instruments as well as Middle Eastern music with backing vocals by Israeli singer Ofra Haza. The song carries a dark sound not present in Abdul's earlier hits and also contains elements of industrial music. The single's B-side is the mid-tempo song "Didn't I Say I Love You", written by Elliot Wolf and Stacey Piersa.

The single featured remixes by British dance band Strike, who subsequently recorded and released their own version of "My Love Is for Real" featuring singer Victoria Newton.  Their version of the song became a UK Clubs Dance Top 10 hit.

Critical reception
Larry Flick from Billboard viewed the song as "an overlooked pop-treasure", describing it as "cute" and "fun". Chuck Campbell from Knoxville News Sentinel described it as "Middle Eastern-flavored" and "slow chugging". In his weekly UK chart commentary, James Masterton wrote, "Her new single goes for the dance angle, reminiscent of her first hit "Straight Up" but this time round unlikely to become too big a hit for her." A reviewer from Music Week gave it four out of five, adding, "Smooth, soulful vocals with a funky rhythm and oriental touches show Abdul back on form."

Chart performance
"My Love Is for Real" was intended to be a comeback single for Abdul, who had not released an album since 1991's triple platinum Spellbound. The single was not as successful as Abdul's previous releases and peaked at number 28 on the US Billboard Hot 100. The song fared better on the Billboard Hot Dance Club Play chart, where it reached the number-one position.

Internationally, "My Love Is for Real" peaked at number seven in Australia and became a top-20 hit in New Zealand and Canada. In the United Kingdom, the song peaked at number 28 on the UK Singles Chart and number three on the UK R&B Chart. The song did not impact Ireland or mainland Europe at all, save for Hungary, where it topped the country's chart, and Germany, where it reached number 87.

Music video
The accompanying music video for "My Love Is for Real", directed by Michael Haussman, features Middle Eastern inspired imagery with Abdul appearing as the head mistress of a harem. The video received two MTV Video Music Award nominations: Best Dance Video and Best Choreography in a Video.

Track listings

 US and cassette CD single
 "My Love Is for Real" (radio edit) – 4:23
 "Didn't I Say I Love You" – 3:29
 "My Love Is for Real" (LP version) – 5:21
 "My Love Is for Real" (R&B remix) – 4:04

 US 7-inch single
A. "My Love Is for Real" (radio edit) – 4:23
B. "Didn't I Say I Love You" – 3:29

 US 12-inch single
A1. "My Love Is for Real" (E-Smoove's Fever mix) – 8:25
A2. "My Love Is for Real" (Strike's Pink Wig dub) – 6:48
B1. "My Love Is for Real" (downtempo club dub) – 8:02
B2. "Didn't I Say I Love You" – 3:05

 UK CD single
 "My Love Is for Real" (E-Smoove's Fever 7-inch edit) – 3:47
 "My Love Is for Real" (LP version) – 5:21
 "My Love Is for Real" (Strike Straight Up There mix) – 7:05
 "Didn't I Say I Love You" – 3:29

 UK cassette single and European CD single
 "My Love Is for Real" (LP version) – 5:21
 "Didn't I Say I Love You" – 3:29

 Australian CD single
 "My Love Is for Real" (LP version) – 5:21
 "My Love Is for Real" (E-Smoove's Fever 7-inch edit) – 3:47
 "My Love Is for Real" (Strike Straight Up There mix) – 7:05
 "Didn't I Say I Love You" – 3:29

Charts

Weekly charts

Year-end charts

Release history

Strike version

British electronic dance music band Strike released their version of "My Love Is for Real" in November 1996. It was released at the fourth single from their only studio album, I Saw the Future (1997). The single reached number 35 in the United Kingdom and number 45 in Scotland. Outside Europe, the song reached number 157 in Australia.

Critical reception
British magazine Music Week rated Strike's version of "My Love Is for Real" four out of five, adding, "The magic is still there from the band who have got making commercial pop dance down to a fine art. Another smash."

Track listings
 UK 12-inch single (1996)
 "My Love Is 4 Real" (Strike's Big Outback 12-inch mix)
 "My Love Is 4 Real" (Strike's Small Upfront dub)
 "My Love Is 4 Real" (Ramp vocal mix)
 "My Love Is 4 Real" (Ramp dub)

 UK CD single (1996)
 "My Love Is for Real" (radio edit) – 3:48 
 "My Love Is for Real" (Strike's Big Outback 12-inch mix) – 6:11 
 "My Love Is for Real" (Strike's Small Upfront dub) – 6:35 
 "My Love Is for Real" (Ramp vocal mix) – 6:37 
 "My Love Is for Real" (Ramp dub) – 7:33

Charts

See also
List of number-one dance hits (United States)

References

1995 singles
1996 singles
1995 songs
Music videos directed by Michael Haussman
Number-one singles in Hungary
Paula Abdul songs
Song recordings produced by Rhett Lawrence
Songs written by Paula Abdul
Songs written by Rhett Lawrence
Strike (band) songs
Trip hop songs
Virgin Records singles
Ofra Haza songs